Francis Lloyd Stubbs (13 April 1878 – 1944) was an English footballer who played in the Football League for Loughborough and The Wednesday.

References

1878 births
1944 deaths
English footballers
Association football goalkeepers
English Football League players
Loughborough F.C. players
Sheffield Wednesday F.C. players